The Gradam Shean-nós Cois Life is an annual award by the Sean-nós Cois Life-festival in Dublin. The award is given to people who have made an exceptional contribution to the tradition of singing in the Irish language.

Recipients have been:
 1993: Mícheál Ó Ceannabháin, Carna
 1994: Áine Bn. Uí Laoi
 1995: Seán 'ac Dhonncha, Carna
 1996: Treasa Ní Mhiolláin, Inishmore
 1997: Éilís Ní Shúilleabháin, Cúil Aodha
 1998: Proinsias Ó Conluain
 1999: Dara Bán Mac Donnchadha, Connemara
 2000: Paídi Mhárthain Mac Gearailt, Dingle Peninsula
 2001: singers from Tory Island
 2002: Mairéad Mhic Dhonncha
 2003: Pádraigín Ní Uallacháin, Armagh
 2004: Máire Uí Dhroighneáin, Spiddal
 2005: Tess Uí Chonghaile
 2006: Ríonach Uí Ógáin
 2007: Eibhlín Uí Dhonnchadha and Seamus Mac Craith
 2008: Máire Ní Cheocháin, Cúil Aodha
 2009: Mícheál Ó Conghaile
 2010: Maidhc Dainín Ó Sé, Dingle Peninsula
 2011: Lillis Ó Laoire
 2012: Mícheál Ó Cuaig
 2013: Máire Ní Chéileachair
 2014: Johnny Mháirtín Learaí Mac Donnchadha, Connemara
 2015: Liam Mac Con Iomaire
 2016: Peadar Ó Ceannabháin
 2017: Josie Sheáin Jeaic Mac Donncha, Carna

References

Irish awards
Sean-nós singers